Bluemont Presbyterian Church and Cemetery is a historic Presbyterian church located near Fancy Gap, Patrick County, Virginia.  It is one of the "rock churches" founded by Bob Childress.  It was built between 1919 and 1950, and is a small frame church building faced in natural quartz and quartzite stone.  It features a Gothic styled hexagonal bell tower.  The rock facing was added to the frame building in 1946.

It was listed on the National Register of Historic Places in 2007.

See also
Buffalo Mountain Presbyterian Church and Cemetery
Mayberry Presbyterian Church
Slate Mountain Presbyterian Church and Cemetery
Willis Presbyterian Church and Cemetery

External links
Stone Churches of Reverend Bob Childress

References

Gothic Revival church buildings in Virginia
Churches completed in 1948
Buildings and structures in Patrick County, Virginia
Churches on the National Register of Historic Places in Virginia
Presbyterian churches in Virginia
National Register of Historic Places in Patrick County, Virginia